The Plants for Human Health Institute (PHHI) is a North Carolina State University research and education organization located at the North Carolina Research Campus in Kannapolis, North Carolina, United States. The institute researches food crops, like fruits and vegetables, and the potential health-promoting properties they may convey when consumed.

PHHI is part of the North Carolina State University College of Agriculture and Life Sciences, which the staffs of the institute with faculty from the departments of horticultural science; food, bioprocessing and nutrition sciences; plant and microbial biology; genetics; and agricultural and resource economics. The institute has both research and Cooperative Extension components. Mary Ann Lila, a blueberry researcher, is director of the Plants for Human Health Institute.

History 

N.C. State began operations in Kannapolis in 2007 as the Fruit and Vegetable Science Institute. The university was one of the first organization to join the biotech hub.

The program's name was changed to Plants for Human Health Institute when the N.C. Research Campus was dedicated on October 20, 2008, in order "to more accurately reflect the groundbreaking research approach the institute will take. Institute research will focus on identifying and making available to consumers bioactive compounds in plants that prevent and treat disease."

As of January 2020, PHHI has about 100 faculty and staff in Kannapolis, not including seasonal staff.

Research

Overview 

Plants for Human Health Institute researchers study the potential health-promoting properties of fruits and vegetables. The institute employs twelve lead researchers.

The institute's mission is to discover and deliver plant-based solutions to improve human health, PHHI researchers target naturally occurring chemical compounds in plants and fresh produce, known as phytochemicals, some of which convey health-promoting properties when ingested. Institute director, Lila, and other PHHI researchers have done research into  phytochemicals, such as anthocyanins present in blueberries and other crops, indicating they provide health benefits against cancer, diabetes and other chronic human diseases when consumed.

In 2013, Lila was a lead researcher in a study involving athletes ingesting blueberry and green tea-infused drinks twice daily during a two-week supplementation period and then for three days of rigorous exercise. Among the results, participants experienced a prolonged spike in their metabolism (up to 14 hours) after exercise.

Programs 

Plants for Human Health Institute researchers integrate expertise in biochemistry, plant breeding, epigenetics, metabolomics, pharmacogenomics, postharvest physiology and systems biology. PHHI research faculty have: 
 Led the team that sequenced the blueberry genome. 
 Discovered evidence that plants of the family Brassicaceae (like mustard greens and kale) could increase muscle mass in people suffering from debilitating disease and the effects of aging. 
 Developed functional food ingredients from health-enhancing plant compounds for undernourished populations in Africa. 
 Created fruit-infused peanut flours to combat peanut allergies. 
 Established multiple plant breeding programs, including broccoli, cabbage and strawberry.

Greenhouse Complex 

The institute operates three greenhouses. The greenhouse complex provides about 10,000 square feet of space for plant trials on crops like broccoli and strawberry, and allow the institute to rent space or collaborate on research with other campus operations and businesses.

Researchers also partner with the Piedmont Research Station, a research farm located near Salisbury, N.C., to grow and test field crops.

Kannapolis Scholars 

Funded by a $1 million U.S. Department of Agriculture – Agriculture & Food Research Initiative (USDA-AFRI) the Kannapolis Scholars was a program for graduate students from multiple disciplines to participate in integrated research. Led by Jack Odle, William Neal Reynolds, Professor of Nutritional Biochemistry at N.C. State, the scholars examined issues in the broad domain of functional foods, bioactive food components and human health. 30 faculty members from eight universities in North Carolina, from multiple disciplines, including food science, nutritional science, plant science, animal science, microbiology, biochemistry and metabolomics act as mentors to the Kannapolis Scholars.

Plant Pathways Elucidation Project (P2EP) 

The Plant Pathways Elucidation Project, or P2EP, was a $1.9 million program that engaged college students across North Carolina in education and research. Operated from June 2013 to December 2019, the program was supported by a consortium of academic and industry organizations, including the Plants for Human Health Institute. The program teamed university scientists, industry leaders and college students to explore plant health benefits, prepare student scientists to pursue careers in STEM fields (Science, Technology, Engineering and Math), and create a research knowledge base.

Extension 

The N.C. State Extension houses a multidisciplinary team at the N.C. Research Campus as part of the Plants for Human Health Institute. The team is an education and outreach component of PHHI directed towards STEM Education and Translational Nutrition.

History 

Blake Brown, Hugh C. Kiger Professor in agricultural economics at N.C. State, started the Program for Value-Added and Alternative Agriculture in 2006 with support from the N.C. Tobacco Trust Fund Commission. The program was originally created to assist the transition of tobacco-farm families to other profitable enterprises after the Tobacco Buyout in 2005.

As the part of N.C. State's development of the N.C. Research Campus, the program relocated to Kannapolis in 2008 as an on-site Cooperative Extension complement to the research personnel and programs with the institute. The program operated under the N.C. MarketReady brand from October 2009 until July 2012. The program has since dropped the name and been fully integrated into the institute as the N.C. State Extension component.

N.C. Research Campus 

The N.C. Research Campus is a public-private venture including eight universities, one community college, the David H. Murdock Research Institute (DHMRI), and corporate entities that collaborate to advance the fields of human health, nutrition and agriculture. It was founded by David H. Murdock, CEO of Dole Foods. The campus is built upon the former site of the Cannon Textile Mill in Kannapolis, about 30 miles north of Charlotte.

The research campus represents an effort by the state of North Carolina to revitalize the region following the decline of the textile industry.

It was announced in November 2013 that two new facilities were breaking ground at the Kannapolis campus, including a 50,000-square-foot data center (Data chambers) and a 100,000-square-foot municipal center (the new Kannapolis City Hall).

The Plants for Human Health Institute is housed on the campus in a 105,000-square-foot facility that includes research labs, lab support areas and an Advance II 700 US - 2 Magnet nuclear magnetic resonance spectroscope.

Funding 
The institute has received $2.1 million in gift donations and $7.8 million in federal and private competitive grants, $1.42 million from the N.C. Tobacco Trust Fund Commission, $2 million from the N.C. Department of Agriculture and Consumer Services and the U.S. Department of Agriculture, $780,000 from the University of North Carolina General Administration, and $1.05 million from commodity groups and other private sponsors. This funding is in addition to state appropriations. PHHI research programs have also received significant grant funding support from the Bill & Melinda Gates Foundation and the National Institutes of Health.

References

External links 
 Plants for Human Health Institute website
 North Carolina State University website
 North Carolina Research Campus website
 North Carolina State University College of Agriculture and Life Sciences website
 North Carolina Cooperative Extension Service website
 North Carolina Agricultural Research Service website

Botanical research institutes
2008 establishments in North Carolina
Kannapolis, North Carolina
High-technology business districts in the United States
Economy of North Carolina
Charlotte metropolitan area
Science parks in the United States
Organizations based in Charlotte, North Carolina
North Carolina State University
Life sciences industry